The Associate is a 1996 American comedy film directed by Donald Petrie and written by Nick Thiel. It stars Whoopi Goldberg, Dianne Wiest, Eli Wallach, Tim Daly, and Bebe Neuwirth, alongside Austin Pendleton and Lainie Kazan.

Plot
Investment banker Laurel Ayres is a smart and single woman trying to make it up the Wall Street corporate ladder, until one day she finds out that she is passed over for a promotion because she is a woman. Unable to face the fact that her less intelligent male protege, Frank Peterson has now become her boss, she quits and tries to start up her own company only to find out that the male dominated world of Wall Street is not interested in taking an African American woman seriously, and thus is forced to create a fictional white man, Robert S. Cutty (inspired by a bottle of Cutty Sark) to legitimize her talents and make her professionally relevant in said world. Ayres does extensive research into the cultural and performative codes of the culture she seeks to impersonate. Ayres' financial wisdom is joined by the intelligent and computer-savvy secretary Sally Dugan, who also was not properly recognized for her talents. Together they are able to become the most successful independent stockbrokers in the world while helping a struggling high-tech computer company stay afloat.

However, the ruse eventually runs into problems because Cutty is still getting credit for Ayres' great ideas, while competing firms and tabloid journalists are willing to do anything in order to bring the wealthy and elusive Cutty into the public and on their side. Thus Ayres is forced to get her best friend (who works at a nightclub as a female impersonator) to create an effective disguise in the mould of Marlon Brando to try to fool the naysayers; when that fails, she and Dugan decide to kill Cutty only to be charged with his murder. Frank uncovers the ruse and pretends that he is now the front man to world-famous Cutty.

The film ends with Ayres donning the Cutty disguise one last time to attend a meeting of the exclusive gentlemen's club to accept Cutty's awards and unmasking herself in order to teach the male-dominated industry the evils of racial and sexual discrimination. Ayres is finally given credit for her work and creates a huge business empire with her friends at the helm. Frank attempts to land a job with the business, only to be laughed off.

Cast

 Whoopi Goldberg as Laurel Ayres / Mr. Robert S. Cutty
 Dianne Wiest as Sally Dugan
 Eli Wallach as Donald Fallon
 Tim Daly as Frank Peterson
 Bebe Neuwirth as Camille Scott
 Austin Pendleton as Aesop Franklin
 Lainie Kazan as Cindy Mason
 George N. Martin as Walter Manchester
 Kenny Kerr as Charlie
 Lee Wilkof as Bissel
 Željko Ivanek as SEC Agent Tompkins
 Colleen Camp Wilson as Detective Jones
 Jerry Hardin as Harley Mason
 Allison Janney as Sandy
 Larry Gilliard Jr. as Thomas
 Vincent Laresca as José
 Jonathan Freeman as Hockey game executive
 John Rothman as Jogging track executive
 Johnny Miller as himself
 Sally Jessy Raphael as herself
 Donald Trump as himself

Production

Development
The film, a remake of René Gainville's 1979 French film of the same name, which, in turn, was based on Jenaro Prieto's 1928 novel The Partner.

Soundtrack

The soundtrack album for The Associate was released on October 15, 1996 by Motown Records. The soundtrack features Queen Latifah, Sophie B. Hawkins, American country singer Wynonna Judd, Canadian-American recording artist Tamia, CeCe Peniston, Kate Pierson and Cindy Wilson (both of The B-52s), Jamaican reggae singer Patra, and Swedish musician Louise Hoffsten.

Release

Box office
The Associate opened theatrically on October 25, 1996 in 1,781 venues and earned $4,261,304 in its opening weekend, ranking sixth in the domestic box office. At the end of its run, the film grossed $12,844,057 domestically.

Critical response
The film received negative reviews from critics. On review aggregator website Rotten Tomatoes, the film has a 28% rating based on 18 critics, with an average rating of 5.2/10.

Peter Stack of the San Francisco Chronicle finds Goldberg "very funny playing out her scheme, which inevitably backfires" and opines that "it's the peripheral characters that give the film its comic momentum."

In contrast, Roger Ebert writing in the Chicago Sun-Times, gave this film two stars, calling it "an uninspired recycling of the Tootsie formula. Though the film "scores some good points against the male-dominated hierarchy of the business world," Ebert is ultimately unconvinced by the Cutty character.

Racquel Gate's book Double Negative, in which she dedicates a portion to reanalyzing The Associate, argues that texts that have been deemed negative or bad, such as The Associate, are often assumed to have nothing of critical value to offer. Her rereading of the film suggests that perhaps its reception falls victim to the same patterns that its content critiques. Gates writes "[b]y criticizing The Associate for not privileging her white, male creation, the reviewers inadvertently underscore how deep the problem truly runs" (Gates, 108).

References

External links
 
 
 

1996 films
1996 comedy films
1990s feminist films
American comedy films
American remakes of French films
1990s English-language films
Cross-dressing in American films
Films directed by Donald Petrie
Films set in New York City
Films shot in New York City
Films based on Chilean novels
Films with screenplays by Jean-Claude Carrière
Interscope Communications films
PolyGram Filmed Entertainment films
Hollywood Pictures films
African-American comedy films
Films scored by Christopher Tyng
1990s American films